The following is a list of Singaporean electoral divisions from 2001 to 2006 that served as constituencies that elected Members of Parliament (MPs) to the 10th Parliament of Singapore in the 2001 Singaporean general election. Each electoral division is further subdivided into polling districts.

Group Representation Constituencies

Single Member Constituencies

See also 

 Group representation constituency

References 

2001